In a Park is a pastel on paper painting, mounted on cardboard, by French artist Berthe Morisot, executed c. 1874. It has the dimensions of 72.5 by 91.8 cm. It is held at the Petit Palais, in Paris.

Description
The painting depicts a young woman in a leisure time in a park with two little girls and a dog. The woman, dressed in black and with a hat, in the foreground, is seated in a field of long grass, at the left, holding a reclined child, while her dog sits in front of them. A net used to catch butterflies lies at her left. Another girl is seen at the right, holding her straw hat, while several trees are at the background of the scene.

The painting demonstrates both the influence of naturalist master Camille Corot and of impressionist painter Édouard Manet, a friend of Morisot, which whose contemporary work it has some similarities. The influence seems to have been mutual between both painters, and Morisot would marry Édouard's brother, Eugène Manet, in 1874.

References

1874 paintings
Paintings by Berthe Morisot
Paintings in the collection of the Petit Palais
Portraits of women
Dogs in art